This is a list of airlines currently operating in Syria:

Scheduled airlines

Charter airlines

See also
List of airlines
List of airports in Syria
List of defunct airlines of Asia

References

Syria
Airlines
Airlines
Syria